Evgeny Mikhailovich Afineevsky (Russian: Евгений Михайлович Афинеевский; born October 21, 1972) is an Israeli-American film director, producer and cinematographer.  He has an Academy Award nomination and Emmy nominations for his documentary Winter on Fire.  Afineevsky resides in the United States.

Early life
Afineevsky was born in Kazan, Tatar ASSR, Russian SFSR, Soviet Union on October 21, 1972 to a Russian-Jewish family. In the early 1990s, Afineevsky became an Israeli citizen and served in the Israeli Defence Forces. As he became involved in the film industry, he relocated to Los Angeles in the United States through connections to Menahem Golan, living there since 1999.  Afineevsky is openly homosexual.

Career

Early Israeli and American works
Afineevsky's filmmaking career began as a teenager when he won the First Prize for Best Documentary in Kazan, the capital of the Republic of Tatarstan, and was invited to participate in the Black Sea International Film Festival hosted by the USSR Pioneer Camp Orlyonok in Krasnodar region, Russia.

In Israel, from 1994-2000, Afineevsky coordinated and produced more than 30 musicals including “Bat” (Die Fledermaus), “Gypsy Baron,” “Viennese Blood,” “Night in Venice,” “Silva Princess of Csárdás”, and “Mozart Konzerte” with the Prague National Opera Orchestra. From 1997 – 1999 he produced and co-directed two stage plays, “The Mousetrap” and “Spider Web”, by Agatha Christie.

"In 1999, still in Israel, he directed the TV series “Days of Love.” In 2000-2002, he produced three feature films, “Crime & Punishment,” starring Crispin Glover, John Hurt, Clive Revill, and Margot Kidder; “Death Game,” starring Billy Drago, Joe Lara, Richard Lynch and Bo Brown; and “The Return from India,” starring Aki Avni, Riki Gal, Assi Dayan, Dana Parnas and Orly Perl."

"As producer of “The Return from India” (2002), Afineevsky received the Israeli Grand from the Israeli Film Fund. In 2005, he received The Gold Special Jury Award from the 38th Annual Houston Worldfest for “The Return from India.” In 2007, he received the Platinum Remi Award from the 40th Annual Houston Worldfest for his film “Crime & Punishment” (2002). In 2008, he received the Platinum Remi Award from the 41st Annual Houston Worldfest for his film “Death Game” (2002). “Oy Vey! My Son Is Gay!” was his feature directorial debut for which he collected over 23 awards in the US and abroad. He created the educational documentary project “Divorce: A Journey Through the Kids’ Eyes,” which received awards and recognition from the US festival circuit."

Documentaries on Ukraine and Syria
His historical feature documentary Winter on Fire was an official selection of the Venice and Telluride international film festivals, received the People’s Choice Award for the Best Documentary from the Toronto International Film Festival, the 2016 Television Academy Honors Award and was nominated for an Academy Award in the Best Documentary category and the Primetime Emmy Awards in the Exceptional Merit in Documentary Filmmaking category. The film covered the Euromaidan protests in Ukraine.

In 2016 Afineevsky spent months on the ground in Syria, using his cameras to craft a comprehensive account of the war. His documentary, Cries from Syria, was an Official Selection at the 2017 Sundance Film Festival. HBO acquired US TV rights to Cries from Syria ahead of its world premiere in the Documentary Premieres section of the 2017 Sundance Film Festival. The film debuted on March 13, 2017 and on HBO NOW, HBO GO, HBO On Demand and affiliate portals.

In August 2017 Afineevsky was awarded with the Friend of the Free Press Trophy by the Los Angeles Press Club for his work on Cries from Syria. He was named the Best Director at the annual Critics' Choice Documentary Awards in New York on November 2, 2017. On November 21, 2017 Producers Guild of America named Cries from Syria among the nominees for the Outstanding Producer of Documentary Motion Pictures Award. He and his film earned IPA Satellite Awards nominations for Best Documentary and Best Song in a Documentary for PRAYERS FOR THIS WORLD, performed by Cher. The Awards Circuit Community Awards nominated his movie as Best Documentary Feature for 2017. He won International Documentary Association’s Courage Under Fire Award, earned a PGA Award nomination, won a Humanitas Prize and Cinema for Peace Awards as Most Valuable Documentary of the Year, won 32nd Fort Lauderdale Film Festival, Documentaries Without Borders Film Festival and 51st Houston WorldFest Film Festival, as well as the Overseas Press Club’s Peter Jennings Award. During 2018, Afineevsky and his movie  Cries from Syria earned four Emmy nominations.

In 2022, Afineevsky released a documentary Freedom on Fire: Ukraine's Fight For Freedom.

Francesco
Afineevsky’s documentary Francesco, released in 2020, features Pope Francis. A segment from the documentary in regards to homosexuality and the Catholic Church triggered worldwide headlines in October 2020. In the documentary, Bergoglio declared, with multiple cuts nonetheless. 

According to Deadline, the statement stirred controversy as it was regarded as contradicting Catholic teachings on homosexuality which officially categorises homosexual activity as "deviant behavior." Afineevsky said concerning this film: "I am not trying to do propaganda. What I'm trying to do, I’m trying to show to the people what they're missing."

Awards 
On February 21, 2020 Catholics in Media Associates awarded him with 2020 CIMA Social Justice Award.

In 2018 he received the Cinema for Peace Award for most valuable documentary of the Year for his movie Cries from Syria.

Filmography
 Death Game (2001)
 Crime and Punishment (2002)
 Oy Vey! My Son Is Gay!! (2009)
 Open Heart (2012)
 Divorce: A Journey Through the Kids' Eyes (2014)
 Winter on Fire: Ukraine's Fight for Freedom (2016)
 Cries from Syria (2017)
 Francesco (2020)
 Freedom on Fire: Ukraine's Fight for Freedom (2022)

References

External links
 
 Winter On Fire: Ukrain's Fight for Freedom  receives TV Academy Honors Award
 Winter On Fire: Ukraine's Fight For Freedom - EMMY AWARDS & NOMINATIONS
 Cries from Syria Official Website
 The International Documentary Association - Courage Under Fire Award

1972 births
Living people
American film directors
American film producers
20th-century American Jews
American people of Russian-Jewish descent
American gay men
Israeli film directors
Israeli film producers
American people of Israeli descent
Israeli people of Russian-Jewish descent
Israeli gay men
Mass media people from Kazan
Russian Jews
Gay Jews
LGBT film directors